Jynge is a surname. Notable people with the surname include:

Andreas Jynge (1870–1955), Norwegian civil servant and writer
Fatma Jynge (1945–2019), Afro-Norwegian architect and politician
Gerhard Jynge (1877–1945), Norwegian newspaper editor

See also
Junge (surname)